Painlevé, a surname, may refer to:


People
 Jean Painlevé (1902–1989), French film director, actor, translator, animator, son Paul
 Paul Painlevé (1863–1933), French mathematician and politician, twice Prime Minister of France

Mathematics
 Painlevé conjecture, a conjecture about singularities in the n-body problem by Paul Painlevé
 Painlevé paradox, a paradox in rigid-body dynamics by Paul Painlevé
 Painlevé transcendents, ordinary differential equation solutions discovered by Paul Painlevé

Other
 French aircraft carrier Painlevé, a planned ship named in honor of Paul Painlevé